Wan Norashikin binti Wan Noordin is a Malaysian politician. She is the Member of Perak State Legislative Assembly for Kampong Gajah from 2008 to 2013 and from 2018 to 2022 and has served as Perak State Executive Councillor.

Election Results

Honour 
  :
 Companion II of the Order of Malacca (DPSM) – Datuk (2011)

References

Living people
People from Perak
Malaysian people of Malay descent
Malaysian Muslims
United Malays National Organisation politicians
Members of the Perak State Legislative Assembly
Women MLAs in Perak
Perak state executive councillors
21st-century Malaysian politicians
Year of birth missing (living people)
21st-century Malaysian women politicians